Monarrhenus salicifolius is a species of plant in the sunflower family found in rocky areas. It is endemic to the Mascarene Islands: Mauritius and Réunion.

References

Inuleae
Plants described in 1824
Flora of Mauritius
Flora of Réunion